Guy Balland (born 16 May 1960) is a French cross-country skier. He competed at the 1988 Winter Olympics and the 1992 Winter Olympics.

References

External links
 

1960 births
Living people
French male cross-country skiers
Olympic cross-country skiers of France
Cross-country skiers at the 1988 Winter Olympics
Cross-country skiers at the 1992 Winter Olympics
People from Champagnole
Sportspeople from Jura (department)